The 2020 XFL Draft was the inaugural player selection process to fill the rosters of the eight teams of the 2020 reboot of the XFL. The draft was held on October 15–16, 2019, via conference call, with results released through the XFL's social media channels.

Structure
The XFL player allocation process was held in multiple phases, separated by position groups. The league used a "snake" format in each phase, in which the draft order reversed with each round. The draft order was shuffled for each phase as predetermined through lotteries. A draft pool of 1,000 eligible players was announced in 200-player installments the week before the draft. The first three phases took place on October 15, with the final two phases occurring on October 16. Teams were given 90 seconds to make each pick.

Each XFL team's manager-coach submitted a list of their preferred quarterbacks, with the league assigning one quarterback to each team prior to the draft as "tier 1" quarterbacks; if multiple teams requested the same player, the league resolved any disputes.

Phase 1: offensive skill positions (other quarterbacks, running backs, wide receivers, and tight ends)—10 rounds
Phase 2: offensive linemen (offensive tackles, guards, and centers)—10 rounds
Phase 3: defensive front seven players (defensive linemen and linebackers)—10 rounds
Phase 4: defensive backs (cornerbacks and safeties)—10 rounds
Phase 5: open draft (any position)—30 rounds. Special teams players (including long snapper, punter, placekicker) have no separate position phase and are relegated to the open pool.

At the conclusion of the draft, each team had a 71-player preseason roster, to be cut down to 52 players by the start of the 2020 XFL season.

A supplemental draft was held November 22, 2019, with 66 additional players selected.

Phase 0: Tier 1 quarterback allocations
Regular draft

Supplemental draft

Phase 1: Skill Players

Phase 2: Offensive line

Phase 3: Defensive front seven

Phase 4: Defensive backs

Phase 5: Open draft
The open draft phase consisted of 30 rounds, but the XFL only released the results sorted by team and position without draft positions.

Supplemental draft

References

Draft, 2020
XFL Draft, 2020
XFL Draft, 2020
Draft
XFL Draft, 2020